Westcliffe may refer to:
Westcliffe, Colorado, United States 
Westcliffe, Kent, England 
Westcliffe Estates, a neighbourhood of Ottawa, Canada

See also
Westcliff (disambiguation)